Herbert Scott is an American football player.

Herbert Scott may also refer to:

Herbert Scott (equestrian) (1885–?)
Herbert S. Scott (1931–2006), American poet
Lord Herbert Scott
Herbert Hedley Scott (1866-1938), Australian museum director and curator

See also
Bert Scott (disambiguation)